Louse Creek may refer to:

Louse Creek (Alaska), a stream in Aleutians West Census Area
Louse Creek (Missouri)
Louse Creek (Niobrara River tributary), a stream in Holt County, Nebraska
Louse Creek (South Dakota)
Louse Creek (Tennessee), a stream in Lincoln County